Benjamin Widom (born 13 October 1927) is the Goldwin Smith Professor of Chemistry at Cornell University. His research interests include physical chemistry and statistical mechanics.  In 1998, Widom was awarded the Boltzmann Medal "for his illuminating studies of the statistical mechanics of fluids and fluid mixtures and their interfacial properties, especially his clear and general formulation of scaling hypotheses for the equation of state and surface tensions of fluids near critical points."

Academic background

Widom was born in Newark, New Jersey. He graduated from New York City's Stuyvesant High School in 1945, and received his BA from Columbia University in 1949, followed by his PhD from Cornell in 1953. He became an instructor of chemistry at Cornell in 1954, was appointed assistant professor in 1955 and a full professor in 1963. He was chair of the chemistry department between 1978 and 1981. He was elected a member of the National Academy of Sciences in 1974 and a fellow of the American Academy of Arts and Sciences in 1979.

Publications

 Theoretical modeling: An introduction. Ber. Bunsenges. Phys. Chem. 1996, 100, 242.
 Theory of phase equilibrium. J. Phys. Chem. 1996, 100, 13190.
 Lekkerkerker, H.N.W.; Widom, B. An Exactly Solvable Model for Depletion Phenomena. Physica A 2000, 285, 483-492.
 Barkema, G.T.; Widom, B. Model of Hydrophobic Attraction in Two and Three Dimensions. J. Chem Phys. 2000, 113, 2349-2353.
 Weiss, V.C.; Widom, B. Contact Angles in Sequential Wetting: Pentane On Water. Physica A 2001, 292, 137-145.
 Widom, B. Surface Tension and Molecular Correlations near the Critical Point, J. Chem. Phys. 1965, 43, 3892-3897.
 Widom, B. Equation of State in the Neighborhood of the Critical Point, J. Chem. Phys. 1965, 43, 3898-3905.
 Widom, B.; Bhimalapuram, P; Koga, K. The Hydrophobic Effect. Phys. Chem. Chem. Phys. (PCCP) 2003, 5, 3085-3093.

Family

Widom's niece, Jennifer Widom is the Frederick Emmons Terman Dean of the Stanford School of Engineering and the Fletcher Jones Professor of Computer Science.

Awards
 New York Academy of Sciences Boris Pregel Award in Chemical Physics
 ACS Langmuir Medal in Chemical Physics, 1982
 ACS Hildebrand Award in Theoretical and Experimental Chemistry of Liquids
 Carnegie-Mellon University Dickson Prize for Science, 1987
 University of Wisconsin–Madison Hirschfelder Prize
 Royal Netherlands Academy of Arts and Sciences, Bakhuys Roozeboom Medal
 Onsager Lectureship, 1994
 Boltzmann Medal, 1998
 IUPAP Commission on Statistical Physics, 1998
 ACS Award in Theoretical Chemistry, 1999
 National Academy of Sciences
 American Philosophical Society
 American Academy of Arts and Sciences Fellow
 New York Academy of Sciences Fellow

Private life

Widom is father to Michael Widom, a professor of physics at Carnegie Mellon University, Elizabeth Widom, a professor of geology at Miami University, and the late Jonathan Widom, a professor of biochemistry at Northwestern University.
He is brother to Harold Widom, professor emeritus of mathematics at U. C. Santa Cruz.

References
 Benjamin Widom at Cornell University's Department of Chemistry and Chemical Biology
 Benjamin Widom wins prestigious Boltzmann medal
 The Boltzmann Award, 1998

1927 births
Living people
People from Newark, New Jersey
Stuyvesant High School alumni
Columbia College (New York) alumni
Cornell University alumni
Theoretical chemists
American physical chemists
Cornell University faculty
Members of the United States National Academy of Sciences
Scientists from New York (state)
Fellows of the American Physical Society